Ollie Joe Prater (born Gilbert Hartzog; August 22, 1946 – November 25, 1991) was an American stand-up comedian and television personality. He made frequent appearances on The Tonight Show.

Prater got his start in stand-up comedy in the 1970s at The Comedy Store and eventually performed in comedy clubs throughout the United States and was a featured performer at many Las Vegas casinos. Prater acted in the film Can I Do It... 'Til I Need Glasses? that featured Robin Williams in his first film performance.  Prater went on to release comedy video specials and albums.

Prater died from complications of a stroke on November 25, 1991.

Discography
 The Best of Ollie Joe Prater (1991) Laughing Hyena Records

References

External links 
 

20th-century American comedians
American stand-up comedians
American male film actors
American television personalities
1991 deaths
1946 births
20th-century American male actors